Burden of proof may refer to:

 Burden of proof (law)
 Burden of proof (philosophy)

Books, film, and television
 The Burden of Proof (1918 film), a silent American film starring Marion Davies
The Burden of Proof (Barlow novel), a 1968 novel by James Barlow
The Burden of Proof (Turow novel), a 1990 novel by Scott Turow
The Burden of Proof (miniseries), a 1992 TV series based on the Turow novel
"Burden of Proof" (CSI episode)
Burden of Proof, a CNN legal analysis show
Burden of Truth (TV series), 2018

Music
Burden of Proof (Soft Machine Legacy album), 2013
Burden of Proof (Bob Schneider album), 2013
Burden of Proof (Benny the Butcher album), 2020